R2 is an expressway in Slovakia, also nicknamed the "southern highway". It starts near Trenčín and ends near Košice. It goes through or around Bánovce nad Bebravou, Prievidza, Žiar nad Hronom, Zvolen, Lučenec, Rimavská Sobota and Rožňava. It is an upgrade, being executed in sections of the Class 1 road , with signage changed to R2 on the completed sections.

The sections between Žiar nad Hronom and Zvolen are shared with R1 and R3.
There is also planned shared section between Ráztočno and Žiar nad Hronom with R3.

From the total length of 338.4 km (excluding shared sections), these sections are in operation (West to East):

 9.6 km Ruskovce - Pravotice (two-lane) 
 5.8 km Žiar nad Hronom bypass (two-lane) 
 7.8 km Zvolen, East - Pstruša
 10.3 km Pstruša - Kriváň
 13.5 km Mýtna - Lovinobaňa, Tomášovce
 6.0 km Ožďany bypass (two-lane) 
 3.3 km Figa bypass (two-lane) 
 10.7 km Tornaľa bypass (two-lane)
 1.2 km Košické Oľšany - R2xD1 intersection

History
Before 1989, when a "federal" highway D1, the route of which would begin in Prague and go through or around Brno, Uherské Hradiště, Drietoma, Trenčín, Žilina, Poprad, Prešov, Košice and Michalovce and end up near the borders of then existing Soviet Union, was considered, the section from Drietoma to Chocholná was included in its route. However, after 1993 the section was included in the route of the R2 along with the sections going from Chocholná, around Ruskovce and Nováky to Žiar nad Hronom. In 1999, the section from Drietoma to Chocholná was completely abolished from the expressway and the beginning of the expressway was moved to the intersection with the D1 motorway in Chocholná. The reason for this was the unwillingness of the Czech side to continue building a highway from Brno to Trenčín around Uherské Hradiště. The later concluded agreement between the Czech Republic and Slovakia determined that the motorway connection of the region to Czechia was to be realized further north, through the Czech D49 motorway and the Slovak R6 expressway, roughly around the corridor of Púchov, Lysá pod Makytou, Horní Lideč and Zlín. In the same year, the D65 motorway, in its section from Zvolen, around Lučenec and Rožňava to Košice was abolished from the construction plans of Slovakia and replaced by the R2 expressway along the same route.

Sections of the expressway

Future of construction

Section Kriváň - Mýtna, under construction

Section Košice, South - Košické Oľšany, under construction

Description of the sections

Ruskovce – Pravotice 
This section in the district of Bánovce nad Bebravou forms the Bánovce nad Bebravou bypass. Section R2 diverted traffic from road I/9 from the villages of Dolné Ozorovce and Horné Ozorovce and Bánovce nad Bebravou. The price for the construction was €88 million. The construction contract was signed on December 30, 2013, the actual construction of the half-profile section of the expressway in the category 1/2 R 24.5/120 officially began on March 6, 2014. The section is 9.56 km long, and there are 15 bridge structures and 3 intersections. The construction was ensured by the association of companies Inžinierske stavby, a.s. and Cesty Nitra, a.s.

The section was originally supposed to be handed over in May 2016, but due to a change in the connection to the original I/9 road at the Bánovce-west interchange, the entire half-profile section was ceremonially handed over for use only on October 6, 2016.

Žiar nad Hronom, North – Žiar nad Hronom, South 
This section with a length of 5.76 kilometers forms the western bypass of Žiar nad Hronom. It leads mainly through agricultural land. The section has two level crossings, 5 bridges and one overpass for pedestrians in Žiar nad Hronom itself. At the intersection of Žiar nad Hronom, South it connects to R1 (southern bypass of Žiar nad Hronom). The construction contract was signed on September 25, 2012, the construction of the half-profile section of the expressway officially began on October 16, 2012, while the last approx. 1.4 km before the level crossing with the R1 was built immediately in full profile. The section includes 5 bridges in length 293 meters. The entire section was handed over for use on December 15, 2014.

Zvolen, East – Pstruša 
The section leads from the Zvolen highway bypass to the east through the northern bypass of the village of Vígľaš to Pstruša. It is 7.85 km long, the category of the built road is R 24.5/120. According to the statements of the State Secretary of the Ministry of Transport, Andrej Holák, in June 2012, construction on the section should have started by June 30, 2013, and should be completed in 2015. However, the construction contract was signed only on July 12, 2014, and the construction itself officially began on September 11, 2014. The section was built for €99 million by the association of the companies Corsan Corviam Construccion and Chemkostav IS s.r.o., the originally estimated cost was €137 million.

There are 14 bridges, a level crossing, and one temporary crossing was also part of the construction, which ensured the connection with I/16 during the construction of the surrounding sections. Due to the demanding pyrotechnic survey from the spring of 2015, construction was delayed and the section was supposed to serve motorists only from November 2016. But despite the postponement of the deadline, the construction was still not completed. The entire section was finally officially handed over for use on May 16, 2017.

Pstruša – Kriváň 
The section Pstruša – Kriváň forms the southern bypass of Detva. It is 10.38 km long and was originally supposed to be built between 2012 and 2015 for €134 million. In the summer of 2012, however, the price was already €232 million. The winning consortium of Strabag, s.r.o., Váhostav SK and Doprastav eventually built this section for €178 million. The contract for the construction was signed on November 12, 2013, the construction itself officially began on November 25, 2013. The route runs parallel to I/16 and railway line 160. There are 18 bridges and 3 intersections on the section built in category R 24.5/120, the Detva feeder connecting the district town to R2 is also part of the construction. 15,000 to 16,000 vehicles pass the route daily. The section was handed over to use in full profile without delay on November 10, 2015.

Kriváň - Mýtna 
The beginning of the route of the R2 Kriváň – Mýtna expressway connects to the previous section of the R2 Pstruša – Kriváň at the temporarily modified Kriváň interchange. The end of the section connects to the next section R2 Mýtna – Lovinobaňa, Tomášovce before the village of Mýtna. This is a technically demanding section, which will include an approx. 5 km long bridge overpass in the valley of the Krivánský stream. This overpass is located at a height of 15–45 m above the route of the I/16 road, in close proximity to high voltage and existing buildings. The length of the section is 9.1 km.

Mytna - Tomášovce 
The Mýtna - Tomášovce section was originally valued at 204 million euros, before the tender it was reduced to 168 million euros. In the end, the tender was won by the company Metrostav for €127.7 million. The Mýtna - Lovinobaňa section was originally planned as one unit up to Kriváň. Metrostav a.s., HOCHTIEF SK s.r.o., HOCHTIEF CZ a.s. is building this section from August 2019 with a completion date of August 2021, financing will be provided by the state budget. Due to poor construction management and delays in transshipment of power networks, the section will be handed over with considerable delay, tentatively only in December 2022. It was officially opened on the 19th of December 2022.

Oždany Bypass 
The Ožďany bypass is a section in operation as a semi-profile expressway. The section is 6.09 km long. The construction took place between 2004 and 2007, the construction costs in the amount of SKK 1,718 Billion (€57 million) were covered by the structural fund, the EIB and the state budget. The contractor of the section was Strabag, a.s. According to STN 736100, category R22.5/100 was used for the section. The proposed route, together with the planned expansion, will ensure load capacity prospects until 2030. There are a total of 6 bridges, one of which is over the Suchá stream. The section eased the burden on the village of Ožďany with traffic as well as exhalates, and also solved the unsatisfactory section of the I/16 behind the village (the so-called Oždany hill). The temporary connection to I/50 is through grade crossings. The section was handed over for early use on December 5, 2006.

Zacharovce – Bátka 
This section of R2 in the half profile will also create a connection with the bypass of Rimavská Sobota, Figa and Tornaľa. The length of the section will be 8.3 km, construction should cost €83 million. The section is located in an agricultural area, so it will be necessary to rebuild country roads. Bridges with a length of 457 meters, two non-elevation crossings, noise barriers are planned. Project documentation for a building permit has been prepared. Purchases of plots under the road began in 2018.

Bátka - Figa 
This section of R2 in the half profile will also create a connection with the bypass of Rimavská Sobota, Figa and Tornaľa. The length of the section will be 6.2 km, construction should cost €67 million. The section is located in an agricultural area, so it will be necessary to rebuild country roads. Bridges with a length of 411 meters, the Bátka rest area, noise barriers are planned. Project documentation for a building permit has been prepared. Purchases of parcels under the road began in 2018.

Figa - Tornaľa 
This section of R2 built in a semi-profile as a bypass of the villages of Figa and Tornaľa. The total length of the section is 14 km. The construction was ensured by Strabag, a.s. and Doprastav, a.s., the financing was from the structural fund, the state budget and the NDS. Construction began in 2003 and ended in 2008. There are 19 bridges on the section, the dominant one is located west of the village of Figa. The categorization of the section is according to STN 736100 R22.5/100, for the half profile, the left part of the future full profile, the category R11.5/100 is used. There are three level crossings here.

Tornaľa – Gombasek 
The planned R2 section will connect the Banská Bystrica and Košice regions. The length of the section will be 18 km. The section will contain 15 bridges and 1 rest stop. It follows from the final opinion of the EIA valid from 06/28/2016 that it will be built in the red variant with the Plešivec tunnel with a length of 1385 meters. The Gombasek rest area will also be located here. According to the NDS website, the section as of 11/2017 is in the process of documentation for a zoning decision.

Rožňava – Jablonov nad Turňou (left lane) 
The planned section R2 in half profile will replace the road I/16 through the Soroška mountain pass. The length of the section will be 14.1 km, the beginning of the section is located in a temporary connection to the road I/16 in close proximity to the intersection of roads I/16 and I/67, south of Rožňava. The route first continues in an eastern direction roughly parallel to the I/16 road, then turns to the southeast where the Soroška tunnel will be located. After the tunnel, the route still bypasses the village of Jablonov nad Turňou from the south and ends in a temporary connection to the road I/16 east of the mentioned village. The section will be built in category R 22.5/100 in half profile i.e. R11.5/100, Soroška tunnel in category T8.0/100 in half profile, the speed in the tunnel will be limited to 80 km/h until the construction of the second, right tunnel tube. Construction of this section was expected to start in 2020, and completion was expected in 2025. The tender was announced on 27.12.2019 and subsequently canceled on 8.7.2020. NDS announced that the project is poorly prepared, does not have a building permit and is not a priority. The implementation of this section is thus postponed to the period after 2030.

Šaca – Košice Oľsany 
This 21.5-kilometer section will be part of the so-called outer (highway) bypass of Košice, which, in addition to the R2 expressway, will also include the D1 motorway and the R4 expressway. From the Šaca intersection, the route of the R2 expressway forms the southern bypass of the city of Košice. It continues around the US Steel complex, south of the Košice airport, through the valley of the Torysa river to the village of Košické Olšany. There, the section as well as the entire R2 expressway ends at the Hrašovík intersection with the D1 highway. The last section of the R2 connects the R2 with the D1 highway at the Košické Oľšany intersection and at the Košice-South intersection with the R4. The length of the entire section will be 24 km. The expected price of this section is €240 million. There will be 15 bridges, 5 intersections, the Valaliky rest stop and the SSÚR Šebastovce expressway management and maintenance center. It follows from the final opinion of the EIA valid from 07.10.2014 that it will be built in the purple variant. According to the NDS website, the section was of 11/2017 is in the process of documentation for a building permit. In 2018, the section was divided into two sub-sections, one going from the R2/R4 Intersection to Košické Olšany (officially Košice, Šaca - Košické Oľsany, part II) and the other from Šaca to the R2/R4 Intersection (officially Košice, Šaca - Košické Oľsany, part I) (alternatively Košice, Šaca - Haniska), with the R2/R4 Intersection - Košické Olšany planned to be constructed first, in the course of 2020. This section (Košice, Šaca - Košické Oľsany, part II) with a total length of 14.3 km finally started construction on 25.3.2022. The contractual completion date is March 21, 2025. The construction contractor is EUROVIA SK a.s., the price of the work is €159 million.

Petition
The mayor of Prievidza, Katarína Macháčková, together with 21 city deputies, initiated a petition for the construction of R2 in the Trenčín region. The text of the petition contains the following request: "I am in favor of immediately including the construction of the five planned sections of the R2 road in the Trenčín self-governing region (D1 - Mníchova Lehota, Mníchova Lehota - Ruskovce, Ruskovce - Pravotice, Pravotice - Dolné Vestenice, Dolné Vestenice - Nováky) among the highest priorities of the Government of the Slovak Republic in the development of road infrastructure in Slovakia. I am asking for a review and adjustment of the road construction schedule so that the construction of the road and its final handing over to use is realized in the shortest possible time."

See also

 Highways in Slovakia
 Transport in Slovakia
 Controlled-access highway
 Limited-access road

References

D1 motorway (Slovakia)
D2 motorway (Slovakia)
D3 motorway (Slovakia)
D4 motorway (Slovakia)
R1 expressway (Slovakia)
R3 expressway (Slovakia)
R4 expressway (Slovakia)
R5 expressway (Slovakia)
R6 expressway (Slovakia)
R7 expressway (Slovakia)
R8 expressway (Slovakia)

External links
 Highways portal by INEKO Institute (slovak)
 Exits of the sections opened in 2006
 https://ww-w.ndsas.sk/narodna-dialnicna-spolocnost
 https://eznamka.sk/selfcare/purchase

Highways in Slovakia